SBI Capital Markets (SBICAPS) is a wholly owned investment banking subsidiary of State Bank of India (SBI). Headquartered in Mumbai, SBICAP has 5 regional offices across India (Ahmedabad, Chennai, Hyderabad, Kolkata and New Delhi) and 4 subsidiaries - SBICAP Securities Limited, SBICAP Trustee Company Limited, SBICAP Ventures Limited and SBICAP (Singapore) Limited.

SBICAP offers the entire bouquet of investment banking and corporate advisory services. The service bouquet includes the full range of Financial Advisory Services under one umbrella covering Project Advisory and Structured Financing, Capital Markets, Mergers & Acquisitions, Private Equity and Stressed Assets Resolution.

History
SBICAPS was established in August 1986.

In January 1997 the Asian Development Bank acquired a 13.84% equity stake in SBICAPS.
This share was repurchased by State Bank of India in March 2010.

Rankings

Dealogic 
 Ranked No.1 MLA  with 7.2% market share (US$20,287M) in the Dealogic Global Project Finance League Loans rankings 
 No.1 MLA of Global PFI/PPP Project Finance Loans with market share of 6.7% (US$3,081M)
 No.1 Financial Adviser (28.0% market share) in the Asia Pacific Project Finance Financial Adviser Ranking
 No.1 MLA  Asia Pacific Project Finance Loans (19.6% market share)
 No.1 Asian Project Finance Loans with 28.9% market share  (US$19,141M)
 In the Global Top 15 deals, Tata Steel Odisha ranked 7th, the only Indian deal to feature in the list.

Bloomberg League Tables
 No.1 Mandated Lead Arranger in Asia-Pac Ex-Japan Loans League Tables 2014, with market share of 8.4% (US$43,857M)
 No.1 Book Runner Asia-Pac ex-Japan Loans - market share 12.5% (Volume US$40,259M)
 In the Asia Pacific Ex -Japan Top Ten Deals, TATA STEEL ODISHA LTD ranked 5th in the list.
 In the India Loans MLA Tables, SBI tops the list with market share of 57.3% (US$43,668M)
 No.1 India Loans Mandated Arranger (INR)- Markets Share 75.5% (Rs.2151bn)

Thomson Reuters-PFI
 Ranked No. 1 Mandated Arrangers  Asia Pacific & Japan with market share of 7.9%
 No.1 Book Runner Asia Pacific & Japan with market share of 14.6%

Prime Database
 Ranked No. 1 in terms of total number of issues including IPO, FPO, RIghts Issues, OFS, QIP and IPP for FY 2017 & FY 2018.
 Ranked No. 2 in terms of total number of issues including IPO, FPO, Rights Issues, OFS, QIP and IPP for FY 2018

References

Investment banks in India
Indian companies established in 1986
State Bank of India
1986 establishments in Maharashtra